The Sphinx Head Society is the oldest senior honor society at Cornell University. Sphinx Head recognizes Cornell senior men and women who have demonstrated respectable strength of character on top of a dedication to leadership and service at Cornell University. In 1929 The New York Times held that election into Sphinx Head and similar societies constituted "the highest non-scholastic honor within reach of undergraduates."

Founding
Sphinx Head was founded on October 11, 1890 by a group of ten men from the senior class. The Society was founded in order to "create and maintain a stronger feeling" for Cornell University and to promote "a closer and stronger friendship among members of the Senior class." The New York Times referred to Sphinx Head as "a secret senior society of the nature of Skull and Bones", a senior honor society at Yale University of which Andrew Dickson White, Cornell University's co-founder and first president, was a member. White encouraged the formation of a secret society system on the Cornell campus.

In 1926, the society built a clubhouse for itself designed to resemble an Egyptian tomb perched halfway down the cliff on the Fall Creek gorge. It sold the building in 1969, and it eventually became the home and office of astronomer Carl Sagan.

Membership

Each year, Sphinx Head taps fewer than forty men and women of the senior class for membership. Since the Society's founding, membership has been "reserved for the most respected" members of the senior class.
The names of newly tapped Sphinx Heads were published in The New York Times through the 1930s, but are now published exclusively in The Cornell Daily Sun.

Sphinx Head awards honorary membership to Cornell administrators, faculty, staff, and alumni for their "significant personal and/or professional accomplishment, outstanding leadership, distinguished service to the university and interest in and commitment to undergraduate student life and development." Notable honorary members of Sphinx Head include Tata Sons Chairman Emeritus Ratan Tata, Atlantic Philanthropies founder Chuck Feeney, and the 12th President of Cornell University, David Skorton.

At Cornell

Sphinx Head has "retained an aura of mystery throughout its history on campus", holding some "closely guarded secrets and traditions."

Although membership in Sphinx Head is public, the proceedings of the Society remain concealed. Since founding the Society, Sphinx Head members have been responsible for starting many long-standing Cornell University traditions such as the annual Dragon Day celebration, the use of "The Big Red" to describe Cornell athletics, as well as Spring Fest, the precursor to the current Slope Day celebration.

Members of Sphinx Head have held many prominent positions within Cornell University serving as presidents, provosts, deans, directors of athletics, Cornell Council members, trustees and chairpersons of the board of trustees. More than one-third of the presidents of the Cornell University Alumni Association have been members and twenty percent of the chairpersons of the Cornell University Board of Trustees have been affiliated with the Society. Names of alumni can be found on the Cornell campus on Bartels Hall, Indimine Athletic Field, Samuel C. Johnson School of Business Management, Robert Kane Track, Jansen Noyes Community Center, Jerome H. Holland International Living Center, Robert Purcell Community Center, Kheel Center for Labor-Management Documentation & Archives, Willard Straight Hall and Upson Hall. Numerous members are also profiled in The 100 Most Notable Cornellians.

Notable alumni

1890–1899
 Louis A. Fuertes (1897): ornithologist; renowned bird artist
 Maxwell M. Upson (1899): namesake of Upson Hall on the Engineering Quad of the Cornell campus; Cornell University Trustee for over 35 years; former President of Raymond International Inc.

1900–1909
 Neal D. Becker (1905): Chairman of the Cornell University Board of Trustees (1947–1953); member of the Council on Foreign Relations; co-founder of the American Australian Association in 1948
 Romeyn Berry (1904): dubbed Cornell Athletics "The Big Red" while composing the lyrics to "The Big Red Team" (a Cornell song) in 1905; Graduate Manager of Cornell Athletics (1919–1935); wrote Dirt Roads to Stoneposts (1949), Stoneposts in the Sunset (1950), and Behind the Ivy (1950)
 John Carpenter (1907): Olympic athlete in the 400 meter race at the 1908 Olympic Games
 Frederick D. Colson (1900): Deputy Attorney General of New York State (1915–1924)
 Adolph H. J. Coors, Jr. (1907): second President of the Coors Brewing Company
 Charles M. French (1909): Olympic athlete in the 800m race in the 1908 Olympic Games
 David C. Munson (1906): gold medalist in the 4 mile team race track & field event at the 1904 Olympic Games
 John L. Senior (1901): first Graduate Manager of Athletics for Cornell University (1901–1907); organized the first Spring Day, the predecessor to the current Slope Day
 Richmond H. Shreve (1902): architect who led the construction of the Empire State Building with his firm Shreve, Lamb and Harmon
 Willard D. Straight (1901): U.S. diplomat; namesake of Willard Straight Hall, a student union that was constructed in 1925 after his death in 1918; founder of Cornell's annual Dragon Day; Cornell University Trustee; donated money for the construction of Schoellkopf Field
 Ray Van Orman (1908): U.S. Olympic lacrosse coach (1928–1932); inducted into the National Lacrosse Hall of Fame in 1992
 William J. Warner (1903): inducted into the College Football Hall of Fame in 1971

1910–1919
 Tell S. Berna (1912): gold medalist in the 3000m team track & field event at the 1912 Olympic Games
 Edward T. Cook, Jr. (1910): gold medalist in the pole vault track & field event at the 1908 Olympic Games
 Babe Clark (1914): American football player
 Ivan C. Dresser (1919): gold medalist in the 3000 meter track & field event at the 1920 Olympic Games
 John "Jack" E. O'Hearn (1915): inducted into the College Football Hall of Fame in 1972
 Murray N. Shelton (1916): inducted into the College Football Hall of Fame in 1973
 Elbert P. Tuttle (1918): chief judge in the U.S. Court of Appeals for the Fifth Circuit in Atlanta, Georgia (overseeing many civil rights cases); recipient of the Presidential Medal of Freedom in 1981

1920–1929
 Charles E. Ackerly (1920): gold medalist in the wrestling (132 lb. weight class) at the 1920 Olympic Games
 Victor L. Butterfield (1927): eleventh President of Wesleyan University (1943–1967); Cornell University Trustee
 Walker L. Cisler (1922): nuclear energy advocate; Chairman of Detroit Edison Company (1948–1964); founder of National Academy of Engineering; Chairman of the International Executive Council of the World Energy Conference; President of the Atomic Industrial Forum and the Fund for Peaceful Atomic Development; recipient of the IEEE Edison Medal "for a career of meritorious achievement in electrical science, electrical engineering or the electrical arts"
 Daniel E. Duryea (1928): film and TV actor immortalized on the Hollywood Walk of Fame; actor in four Broadway shows
 Thomas C. Hennings, Jr. (1924): U.S. Congress Representative for Missouri 11th District (1934–1940); Senator of Missouri (1951–1960); vigorous proponent of civil liberties, Director of the Foreign Policy Association and of Big Brothers of America<ref>Cornell Alumni News, December, 1960</ref>
 Eddie L. Kaw (1923): inducted into the College Football Hall of Fame in 1954
 Edward B. Kirby (1924): bronze medalist in the 3000m team track & field event at the 1924 Olympic Games
 George R. Pfann (1924): Secretary of Staff to General George S. Patton during his campaign in North Africa, Sicily and Germany; Rhodes Scholar; Cornell University Board of Trustees; inducted into the College Football Hall of Fame in 1957
 Henry A. Russell (1926): gold medalist in the 4 × 100 m race track & field event at the 1928 Olympic Games
 Frank L. Sundstrom (1924): U.S. Congress Representative for New Jersey 11th District (1943–1949); inducted into the College Football Hall of Fame in 1978
 Franchot Tone (1927): actor nominated for an Academy Award for Best Actor in 1935 for Mutiny on the Bounty (1935); immortalized on the Hollywood Walk of Fame; stage actor featured in 24 Broadway shows
 Eugene Tonkonogy (1926): entrepreneur

1930–1939
 Jerome "Brud" H. HollandCornell Alumni News, September 1960. (1939): President of Delaware State College (1953–1959) and Hampton Institute (1960–1970); U.S. Ambassador to Sweden (1970–1972); Chairman of the American Red Cross Board of Governors (1980–1985); first African-American to serve on the board of the New York Stock Exchange; inducted into the College Football Hall of Fame in 1965
 Robert J. Kane (1934): President of the U.S. Olympic Committee (1977–1980); Director of Athletics at Cornell (1946–1971); author of Good Sports: A History of Cornell Athletics; namesake of the Robert J. Kane Track
 Theodore Kheel (1935): Executive Director of the National War Labor Board; author of The Keys to Conflict Resolution Oscar G. Mayer, Jr.http://cornellsun.com/section/news/content/2009/07/08/oscar-mayer-’34-retired-chair-meat-company-dies-95  (1934): business executive who served as chairman of Oscar Mayer; retired in 1971 after 41 years at the company and achieving over 1 billion dollars in annual sales
 Jansen Noyes, Jr. (1939): Chairman of the Cornell University Board of Trustees (1978–1984); Director of Helen Keller International, 1946–1996
 Robert W. Purcell (1932): Chairman of the Cornell University Board of Trustees (1968–1978); donor and namesake of Robert Purcell Community Center (RPCC)
 Henry S. Reuss (1933): U.S. Congress Representative for Wisconsin (1955–1983); co-founder of the Peace Corps
 Robert V. Tishman (1937): founder of Tishman Speyer Properties
 E. Stewart Williams (1932): Palm Springs, California-based architect with a distinctive modernist style

1940–1949
 Nicholas Drahos (1941): inducted into the College Football Hall of Fame in 1981
 Edward T. Peterson (1948): professional basketball player with the Syracuse Nationals and Tri-Cities Blackhawks
 Samuel R. Pierce, Jr. (1944): Secretary of the United States Department of Housing and Urban Development under President Ronald Reagan (1981–1989)

1950–1959
 Colin G. Campbell (1957): Chairman, President, and CEO of the Colonial Williamsburg Foundation; thirteenth and youngest President of Wesleyan University (1970–1988); President of the Rockefeller Brothers Fund (1987–2000)
 Kenneth T. Derr (1958): Chairman and CEO of Chevron Corporation (1989–1999); member of the Council on Foreign Relations 
 Samuel C. Johnson, Jr. (1950): former Chairperson of S. C. Johnson & Son, Inc.; major donor and co-namesake of the Johnson Graduate School of Management at Cornell University
 Robert D. Kennedy (1954): President and CEO of Union Carbide (1986–1995)
 Charles F. Knight (1957): Emerson Electric CEO (1973–2000), President (1986–1988, 1995–1997), and Board Chairman (1974–2000); board member of many other companies including Anheuser-Busch (1987–present), AT&T (2006–present), IBM (1993–present), Baxter International, British Petroleum (1987–2005), Caterpillar Inc., Missouri Pacific, Morgan Stanley (1999–2005), Ralston Purina, SBC (1983–2006), and Southwestern Bell (1974–1983)
 Thomas C. Reed (1955): nuclear weapons expert; U.S. Secretary of the Air Force from January 2, 1976 – April 6, 1977 under Presidents Gerald Ford and Jimmy Carter; 6th Director of the National Reconnaissance Office (August, 1976-April 1977)
 Richard "Dick" Savitt (1950): professional tennis player; winner of Wimbledon and the Australian Open in 1951; ranked 2nd in the world for tennis in 1951; inducted into several halls of fame including the International Tennis Hall of Fame (1976), the International Jewish Sports Hall of Fame (1986), Tennis Association Men's Collegiate Tennis Hall of Fame (1986), and the USTA Eastern Tennis Hall of Fame (1999)
 Richard "Dick" J. Schaap (1955): sports broadcaster for NBC, ABC and ESPN; received two Emmy Awards; author and co-author of 33 books

1960–1969

 Steven B. Belkin (1969): founder and Chairman of Trans National Group; Cornell Entrepreneur of the Year (2004); Cornell University Trustee; minority owner of the Atlanta Thrashers and Atlanta Hawks
 Dave Bliss (1965): former head basketball coach of Baylor University and Southern Methodist University; major participant in the Baylor University basketball scandal
 Samuel W. Bodman (1961): former United States Secretary of Energy (2005–2009), former Deputy Secretary of the Treasury (2004), and former Deputy Secretary of Commerce (2001–2004); Cornell University Trustee
 Peter H. Coors (1969): Chairman of the Coors Brewing Company
 Peter K. Gogolak (1964): football player for the New York Giants, Buffalo Bills
 H. Peter Larson III (1967): professional football player with the Washington Redskins (1967–1968)
 Gary F. Wood (1964): professional football player for the New York Giants (1964–1966, 1968–1969) and the New Orleans Saints (1967); inducted into the National Jewish Sports Hall of Fame in 1996

1970–1979
 Jon P. Anderson (1971): winner of the 1973 Boston Marathon and 1981 Honolulu Marathon; member of the 1972 US Olympic track and field team
 Michael G. French (1976): First Team All-American lacrosse player; inducted into the National Lacrosse Hall of Fame in 1991
 Ed Marinaro (1972): runner-up for the 1971 Heisman trophy; inducted into the College Football Hall of Fame in 1991; actor most known for his portrayal of Officer Joe Coffey in Hill Street Blues; selected as one of the 100 Most Notable Cornellians John M. Paxton, Jr. (1973): United States Marine Corps General Officer; 33rd Assistant Commandant of the Marine Corps; previously Commanding General, II Marine Expeditionary Force; previously J-3, Director for Operations for The Joint Chiefs of Staff

1980–1989
 Darren J. Eliot (1983): professional hockey goaltender; member of the 1984 Canadian Olympic ice hockey team
 James Knowles (1987): Head Coach of the Cornell University Men's Football team (2004–2009)
 Daniel P. Meyer (1986): Executive Director for Intelligence Community Whistleblowing & Source Protection (ICW&SP); former Naval officer and whistleblower during the investigation into the explosion onboard battleship USS Iowa (BB-61)
 Joe Nieuwendyk (1988): 21-year NHL veteran; three-time Stanley Cup winner; 2002 Olympic gold medal winner; General Manager of the Dallas Stars of the NHL
 Leo J. Reherman (1988): professional football player (Miami Dolphins); competed on American Gladiators'' as "Hawk" (1993–1996); sports broadcaster for ESPN

1990–1999
 Seth C. Payne (1997): professional football player (Houston Texans)

2000–present
 Mitchell D. Belisle (2007): Major League Lacrosse player on the Los Angeles Riptide (2007–present); recipient of the 2007 Schmeisser Award, awarded to the nation's most outstanding NCAA lacrosse defenseman
 Tori Christ (2014): Professional Soccer Player Boston Breakers and the Swedish team Västerås BK30
 Sean Collins (2012): professional hockey player Columbus Blue Jackets in the National Hockey League and Springfield Falcons in the American Hockey League
 Seth N. Flowerman (2008): entrepreneur recognized for his business success while a student in high school and college
 Jeff Mathews (2014): professional football player, Atlanta Falcons
 Ryan McClay (2003): 2010 Men's National Lacrosse Team
 Brendon Nash (2010): professional hockey player Montreal Canadiens in the National Hockey League and Hamilton Bulldogs in the American Hockey League
 Riley Nash (2011): player for the Carolina Hurricanes
 Manuel Natal (2008): Member of the 29th House of Representatives of Puerto Rico (2013–present)
 Rob Pannell (2012): NCAA Division I Men's Lacrosse all-time points leader; the Ivy League's first-ever three-time Player of the Year award winner; ESPY nominee; recipient of the 2013 Tewaaraton Trophy; currently plays for the Long Island Lizards
 Maxwell O. Seibald (2009): four-time All-American Lacrosse player; recipient of the 2009 Tewaaraton Trophy; recipient of the 2009 Lt. Raymond Enners Award; recipient of the McLaughlin Award; the only men's lacrosse player in the history of the Ivy League to be named a four-time first-team All-Ivy selection; 2010 Men's National Lacrosse Team; currently plays for the Denver Outlaws
 Luke Tasker (2013): professional football player, San Diego Chargers
 Dominique Thorne (2019): actress, notably portraying Riri Williams / Ironheart in the upcoming Marvel Cinematic Universe Disney+ television series Ironheart.
 Bryan Walters (2010): wide receiver for the Jacksonville Jaguars of the National Football League
 Cheryl Yeoh (2005): Chinese-Malaysian entrepreneur, speaker and angel investor.

References

Collegiate secret societies
Honor societies
1890 establishments in New York (state)
Student societies in the United States
Student organizations established in 1890